The China Railways DJ1 is a high power mainline electric freight locomotive built as a double locomotive unit of two nominally independent single cab units.

History and design
The locomotives are based on a technology transfer agreement between Siemens and Zhuzou Electric locomotive works (ZELW). The first three locomotives were built by Siemens in Austria, and the remaining 17 were built in China.

The electrical components in the locomotive are based upon Siemens' EuroSprinter design (second generation using water-cooled GTO inverters).

3 of the units were manufactured by Siemens in Austria, the remaining 17 in China; the first locomotive was produced in 2001. The first china manufactured unit was produced in 2002. Production of the locomotive ended in 2004.

The locomotives were used to haul coal trains on the Daqin line.

As more powerful locomotive models HXD1 and HXD2 entered Daqin line since 2006, the 20 DJ1s were allocated to Xi'an Railway Bureau to haul freight trains running between Baoji and Qinling.

See also
 List of locomotives in China
 China Railways HXD1 successor locomotive

References

External links
 
 Image: Two DJ1 units, coal train  via www.railpictures.net

DJ1
Zhuzhou locomotives
Siemens locomotives
25 kV AC locomotives
Standard gauge locomotives of China